Oddmund is a given name. Notable people with the given name include:

Oddmund Andersen (1915–1999), Norwegian footballer
Oddmund Finnseth (born 1957), Norwegian jazz musician, composer and music teacher
Oddmund Hagen (born 1950), Norwegian poet, novelist, children's writer and literary critic
Oddmund Hammerstad (born 1942), Norwegian military officer, businessman and politician
Oddmund Hoel (1910–1983), Norwegian politician
Oddmund Jensen (1928–2011), Norwegian cross-country skier and coach
Oddmund Myklebust (1915–1972), Norwegian politician
Oddmund Raudberget (born 1932), Norwegian artist, painter, and sculptor
Oddmund Vik (1858–1930), Norwegian politician